Halloween Is Grinch Night (titled It's Grinch Night for the 1992 videocassette release and Grinch Night for the sing-a-long videocassette release) is a 1977 children's animated Halloween television special and is a prequel to the 1966 television special How the Grinch Stole Christmas! It premiered on ABC on October 28, 1977. The original voice actor for the Grinch, Boris Karloff, by then deceased, was replaced by Hans Conried, though Thurl Ravenscroft, who sang on the original special, again provided singing vocals. The songs and score were written by Sesame Street composer Joe Raposo.

The special won the 1978 Primetime Emmy Award for Outstanding Children's Program.

Plot 
In Whoville each Halloween, a "Sour-Sweet Wind" blows and a chain of events causes the Gree-Grumps and Hakken-Krakks to arouse the Grinch into descending to Whoville in his paraphernalia wagon and wreaking havoc in the town on "Grinch Night". All of Whoville dreads the smell of the wind as an omen, and everyone retreats to their home as the whole village goes into lockdown.

Euchariah, a young Who with astigmatism, goes out to the "euphemism" and blows away. He runs into the Grinch as he is picking brickles out of his fur, the result of a failed attempt to hunt down the last Wuzzy Woozoo. After giving Euchariah a brief spook, the Grinch decides the young boy is too small to waste time on and resumes his trek to Whoville.

Euchariah decides that he must stall the Grinch in order to save Whoville. Catching up to the Grinch's wagon, the irritated Grinch decides to give Euchariah the "spook's tour", and Euchariah is drawn in to a surreal nightmare with spooks and monsters in all directions. Euchariah endures the spooks just long enough for the Sour-Sweet Wind to die down, forcing the Grinch to abandon the trek and return home. His dog Max, visibly depressed and nostalgic throughout the special, refuses to return with the Grinch and follows Euchariah home where he is greeted as a hero; the Grinch laments that he will "miss that Grinch Night Ball" but finds solace in "that wind will be coming back, someday; I'll be coming back, someday!" and then ends this promise with a sinister laugh.

Voice cast 
 Hans Conried: The Grinch/Narrator
 Gary Shapiro: Euchariah
 Henry Gibson: Max (singing)
 Hal Smith: Josiah
 Jack DeLeon: Sergeant Samuel McPherson
 Irene Tedrow: Mariah
 June Foray: Additional Voices
 Mel Blanc: Monsters, Chorus
 Paul Frees: Monsters, Chorus
 Thurl Ravenscroft: Singer, Monsters
 The Mellomen: Chorus, Monsters

Songs 
 "I Wouldn't Go Out on a Night Like This" – Josiah
 "The Grinch Night Ball" – The Grinch
 "How Many Times" – Max's inner voice, The Grinch
 "As the Grinch Creaks Ever Closer..." – Chorus
 "I Wouldn't Go Out on a Night Like This" (reprise) – Chorus
 "He Is Wandering in the Wind" – Chorus
 "The Eyebrow Song" – The Grinch
 "The Spooks Tour" (the song starts with a round by all of the singers, then turns into a duet between Ravenscroft and Winchell)
 "Grinch Is Gonna Get You" – Monster Chorus (Conried, Ravenscroft, thrush, The Mellomen, Blanc, Frees and Winchell)
 "Members of the Un-human race" – Monster Chorus (Ravenscroft and Winchell)
 "The Spooks Tour Finale" – Monster Chorus (Conried, thrush, Ravenscroft, The Mellomen, Blanc, Frees and Winchell)
 "Gone Is the Grinch" – Chorus

Home media 
The special was first released on VHS by CBS/Fox Video via their PlayHouse Video banner in 1985. In 1992, The special
was released again by Random House Home Video on VHS under the title It's Grinch Night. It was also released on VHS by CBS Video through Fox Kids Video in 1996 under the title Grinch Night, along with a sing-along version. In 2003, the special was released as a bonus special on the VHS and DVD release of Dr. Seuss on the Loose from Universal Studios Home Entertainment under its original title (though the packaging and menu still referred to it as Grinch Night). On October 18, 2011, the special was released on DVD by Warner Home Video under Dr. Seuss's Holidays on the Loose!, along with How the Grinch Stole Christmas! and The Grinch Grinches the Cat in the Hat. On October 23, 2018, it was released on Blu-ray by Warner Bros. Home Entertainment as an extra on Dr. Seuss' How the Grinch Stole Christmas: The Ultimate Edition, along with The Grinch Grinches the Cat in the Hat. Both extras were remastered in high definition for this release.

See also 
 How the Grinch Stole Christmas!, original 1957 book

References

External links 
 
 

Television shows written by Dr. Seuss
1970s animated television specials
American Broadcasting Company television specials
Dr. Seuss television specials
Halloween television specials
American Broadcasting Company original programming
Musical television specials
1977 in American television
1977 television specials
1970s American television specials
Films scored by Joe Raposo
Television specials by DePatie–Freleng Enterprises
The Grinch (franchise)
Films directed by Gerard Baldwin